The Donley County Courthouse and Jail, on Public Sq. in Clarendon, Texas, was listed on the National Register of Historic Places in 1978.  It is also a Texas State Antiquities Landmark and a Recorded Texas Historic Landmark.

The courthouse was designed by architects Bulger & Rapp and was built during 1890–91.

The Pauley Jail Building Co. provided plans and materials for the jail.

See also

National Register of Historic Places listings in Donley County, Texas
Recorded Texas Historic Landmarks in Donley County
List of county courthouses in Texas

References

Courthouses in Texas
Courthouses on the National Register of Historic Places in Texas
Jails in Texas
National Register of Historic Places in Donley County, Texas
Romanesque Revival architecture in Texas
Government buildings completed in 1903